Dalwood is a locality in the Singleton Council local government area of New South Wales, Australia.

References

Localities in New South Wales
Suburbs of Singleton Council